Cunningham Drug was a drugstore chain based in Detroit, Michigan. Founded in October 1889 by Andrew Cunningham, the chain operated primarily within the state of Michigan, and was once the largest drugstore chain in the state. Its Michigan locations were closed and reopened in 1982 as Apex Drug, and were later sold to Perry Drug Stores. The last stores remained open in Florida until 1991, when they were sold to Walgreens.

History

Andrew Cunningham opened the first Cunningham drug store in Detroit in October 1889. In 1931, the 50-store Economical Drug chain, also based in Detroit, consolidated with Cunningham, which at the time had thirteen stores. Economical Drug owner Nate Shapero also assumed control of the Cunningham chain. Cunningham announced a merger with Marshall Drug Co. of Cleveland, Ohio in 1940.

Between 1958 and 1959, the chain announced mergers with two other chains: Broward Drug of Fort Lauderdale, Florida and Kinsel Drug Co., also of Detroit. Following the merger, Cunningham became the largest drugstore chain in Michigan, and had locations in several other states. An effort was made by the United States Department of Justice to dissolve the Kinsel merger, citing that it was in violation of the Clayton Antitrust Act. The dissolution was canceled in 1963.

An acquisition of Whelan Drug in Florida added fourteen more Cunningham locations to that state in 1964. The chain later sold 28 Florida stores to Gray Drug of Ohio.

Cunningham's also had some small drug stores branded as Schettler's in major hotels, such as the Sheraton-Cadillac in Detroit, and at high-end retail, such as at Somerset Mall in Troy, Michigan. In the 1960s, a small number of Cunningham's were re-branded as Dot Discount, an experiment which did not expand further, but which lasted a couple decades, some years after all Cunningham's had closed in the Detroit area.

The chain sold off twenty-eight of its Michigan stores in 1982 to a private company, which re-branded them as Apex Drug. Three years later, most of the Apex locations were sold to Perry Drug Stores, another chain based in the Detroit metropolitan area.

The remaining Cunningham stores were gradually sold off or shuttered; by late 1991, the last five in operation, all in the Fort Lauderdale, Florida area, were sold to Walgreens.

References

Rite Aid
Retail companies disestablished in 1982
Retail companies established in 1889
Defunct pharmacies of the United States
Defunct companies based in Detroit
1889 establishments in Michigan
Health care companies based in Michigan
1982 disestablishments in Michigan
Walgreens Boots Alliance